Ben Murphy (born 20 January 1996) is a Welsh rugby union player who plays for Doncaster Knights in the second row.

Murphy made his debut for the first XV in 2017 having previously played for the academy side.

References

External links 
Cardiff Blues profile

Welsh rugby union players
Cardiff Rugby players
Doncaster Knights players
Living people
1996 births
Rugby union locks